The 1944 Yukon general election was held on 9 February 1944 to elect the three members of the Yukon Territorial Council. The council was non-partisan and had merely an advisory role to the federally appointed Commissioner.

Members
Dawson - John Fraser
Mayo - Ernest Corp
Whitehorse - Alexander Smith

References

1944
1944 elections in Canada
Election
February 1944 events